John Suler is Professor of Psychology at Rider University who has written on the behavior of people online. Suler earned a B.A. in psychology from the State University of New York at Stony Brook and his Ph.D. in Clinical Psychology from the State University of New York at Buffalo.

See also
 Online disinhibition effect

References

External links

Living people
Rider University faculty
21st-century American psychologists
Stony Brook University alumni
University at Buffalo alumni
Place of birth missing (living people)
Year of birth missing (living people)
Behaviourist psychologists